Coleophora eucalla is a moth of the family Coleophoridae. It is found in China.

References

eucalla
Moths of Asia
Moths described in 1999